Pythiaceae is a family of water moulds. The family includes serious plant and animal pathogens in the genus Pythium. The family was circumscribed by German mycologist Joseph Schröter in 1893.

Lifecycle
Live on land (terrestrial), and in water (aquatic), and a combination of the two, (amphibious)
Live as deadly parasites, causing some serious plant and animal diseases when terrestrial.  
The diploid (2N) life stage predominates, with a short haplophase initiated during sexual reproduction as well as asexual reproduction (homothallism predominates in the Family) to fuse gametes.

Reproduction
The sporangia may germinate via a germ tube or by release of motile zoospores, depending on the species and the environmental conditions.

Economic importance
Some Pythium species cause "damping off" diseases in young plants (seedlings).

References

 C.J. Alexopolous, Charles W. Mims, M. Blackwell  et al., Introductory Mycology, 4th ed. (John Wiley and Sons, Hoboken NJ, 2004)  

Peronosporales
Heterokont families
Water mould plant pathogens and diseases